Gjøl is a town on the north coast of the Limfjord in North Jutland, Denmark. The shallow part of the fjord to the west of the ridge, Gjøl Bredning, is a wildlife preserve.

History
The placename is first recorded in 1231 as Giol and is related to the word gul (yellow), a reference to the chalky cliffs of the moraine.

Until the early twentieth century, the site of the town was an island.

Thomas Dam created the first troll dolls in Gjøl in the mid-1950s and the Dam Things company is still located in the town; in Denmark they are known as Gjøl trolls as well as Dam trolls. The town is also known for mink farms.

Church
Gjøl Church was built around 1150 and has a Romanesque nave and choir and late Gothic tower. The doorways were originally richly decorated with carvings; the signature of master carver Goti is preserved. The choir was decorated with frescos in the 1530s.

In media
Hans Kirk's 1928 novel Fiskerne (The Fishermen) is based on the true story of a group of fishermen from the North Sea coast who moved to Gjøl and came into conflict with those who lived there. Kirk had a connection to the area through his father, and wrote the book while living at the old inn in the town, Gjøl Kro.

References

Fishing communities in Denmark
Cities and towns in the North Jutland Region
Jammerbugt Municipality
Villages in Denmark